Jordan Creek is a stream in Johnson County, Iowa, in the United States.

Jordan Creek was so named when a pioneer fell into the creek, and he joked he had been baptized in the Jordan River.

See also
List of rivers of Iowa

References

Rivers of Johnson County, Iowa
Rivers of Iowa